Egypt is a hamlet near Thornton, in the City of Bradford, West Yorkshire, England.

Geography 

High walls that were erected to hold back the waste rock from the local quarries flank the road, giving rise to the nickname "The Walls of Jericho".

History 

The hamlet was established in the first half of the 19th century and is named on maps surveyed in the late 1840s. Its name may be related to the commemoration of the 1798 invasion of Egypt by the troops of Napoleon Bonaparte, or the nearby Egypt Methodist Chapel which was already demolished by 1876. The names of other hamlets in the area such as Jericho, Jerusalem, and World's End are also of biblical origin.

Quarrying was the major industry in the area, with about 30 active quarries reported in the 1870s.

See also
Listed buildings in Thornton and Allerton, West Yorkshire

References

External links 

  - Description of a circular walk in the area

Hamlets in West Yorkshire
Geography of the City of Bradford